Whitteridge is a surname. Notable people by that name include:

 Gweneth Whitteridge (1910-1993), president of the History of Medicine Society of the Royal Society of Medicine.
 Gordon Whitteridge (1908–1995), British diplomat.